Naked Blues is the first studio album by The Legendary Tigerman released in 2002.

Track listing
 Gonna Shoot My Woman
 Naked Blues
 Break My Bone
 I'll Make You Mine
 Sauselito 1PM
 Mannish Boy
 Lust
 I'm Just a Man
 Sometimes I Miss You

2002 debut albums
The Legendary Tigerman albums